The EHF Cup Winners' Cup was the official competition for men's and women's handball clubs of Europe that won their national cup, and took place every year. From the 2012–13 season, the men's competition was merged with the EHF Cup.

Winners

By country

See also
 EHF Women's Cup Winners' Cup

References

External links
Official website

 
European Handball Federation competitions
Recurring sporting events established in 1975
Recurring sporting events disestablished in 2012